RSM-45 R-31 (NATO designation - SS-N-17 Snipe) was a Soviet submarine-launched ballistic missile.

Development for the missile began in June 1971 at the Arsenal Design Bureau. It was fitted on only one Yankee II class submarine, originally for evaluation purposes. A first test flight took place from the Yankee II Class submarine K-140 (photo) in December 1976. The RS-16 was the first solid-fueled ICBM in the Soviet Union's strategic arsenal. It was a two-stage delivery device armed with a single 500 kt nuclear warhead. A particular practical benefit of the design was the quiet submerged launch system, which used the missile's own buoyancy to lift it to the surface.

The missile entered service in March 1980, but was never installed in any other submarine other than the K-140, and was out of service by 1991. Apparently this missile was also capable of performing the duties of SLCMs, as the targeting distance could be varied drastically.

It was the first Soviet ballistic missile using astro-inertial guidance.

Users

Soviet Navy

References

Sources 
SS-N-17 at MissileThreat
MILNET: Strategic Missiles

R-031
Arsenal Design Bureau products
Arsenal Plant (Saint Petersburg) products
Military equipment introduced in the 1980s